Agrotis brachypecten is a moth of the  family Noctuidae. It is found in the Middle East, including Oman and Yemen.

Agrotis
Moths of the Arabian Peninsula
Moths described in 1899